Arocatus is a genus of bugs in the family Lygaeidae.

Species
Species within this genus include:
 Arocatus aenescens Stal, 1874
 Arocatus chiasmus Slater Alex, 1985
 Arocatus elengantulus Tsai & Rédei, 2017
 Arocatus fastosus Slater Alex, 1985
 Arocatus longicephalus Slater, 1972
 Arocatus longiceps Stal, 1872
 Arocatus melanocephalus (Fabricius, 1798)
 Arocatus melanostoma 
 Arocatus montanus Slater Alex, 1985
 Arocatus nanus (Breddin, 1900)
 Arocatus nicobarensis (Mayr, 1865)
 Arocatus pilosulus Distant, 1879
 Arocatus pseudosericans Gao, Kondorosy & Bu, 2013
 Arocatus roeselii (Schilling, 1829)
 Arocatus rubromarginatus (Distant, 1920)
 Arocatus rufipes Stal, 1872
 Arocatus rusticus (Stal, 1867)
 Arocatus sericans (Stal, 1859)
 Arocatus suboeneus Montandon, 1893

References

External links 
 

Lygaeidae
Hemiptera of Europe
Pentatomomorpha genera